I'll Be Gone in the Dark is an American true crime documentary television series directed by Liz Garbus, Elizabeth Wolff, Myles Kane and Josh Koury, revolving around Michelle McNamara as she writes a book about and investigates the Golden State Killer. The original six-part series premiered on June 28, 2020, on HBO, and concluded on August 2, 2020. A special episode premiered on June 21, 2021.

Premise
Michelle McNamara lived a quiet life, but as her family slept, she spent the night investigating and writing a book about the Golden State Killer, delving into the world of online chat rooms and crime blogs. She hid her addiction to opioids which ultimately contributed to her death prior to the completion of her book.

Episodes

Production
In April 2018, HBO Documentary Films acquired rights to I'll Be Gone in the Dark by Michelle McNamara, with plans to adapt the book into a docuseries, with her husband Patton Oswalt serving as an executive producer. Production on the series began on April 24, 2018. In May 2018, it was announced Liz Garbus would direct the series. McNamara's researcher Paul Haynes and crime journalist Billy Jensen, both of whom helped Oswalt finish the book, were signed on as co-executive producers. The series features interviews with detectives, survivors, family members, and Amy Ryan narrating excerpts from McNamara's book.

Reception

Critical response
Review aggregator Rotten Tomatoes reported an approval rating of 96% based on 48 reviews, with an average rating of 8.37/10. The website's critical consensus reads, "Director Liz Garbus smartly centers I'll Be Gone in the Dark around the late Michelle McNamara's passionate efforts, weaving together a heavy, but important tapestry of trauma, obsession, and survival. Metacritic gave the series a weighted average score of 82 out of 100 based on 20 reviews, indicating "universal acclaim".

Ratings

References

External links
 
 

2020 American television series debuts
2021 American television series endings
2020s American documentary television series
Documentary television series about crime in the United States
English-language television shows
HBO original programming
Joseph James DeAngelo
Television series by Home Box Office
Television series about serial killers
Television shows based on non-fiction books
Television shows set in California
Television shows set in Sacramento, California
True crime television series